Senator Gordon may refer to:

Members of the Northern Irish Senate
 Alexander Gordon (Northern Ireland politician) (1882–1967), Northern Irish Senator from 1950 to 1964

Members of the Philippine Senate
 Richard J. Gordon (born 1945), Philippine Senator from 2004 to 2010 and since 2016

Members of the United States Senate
 James Gordon (Mississippi politician) (1833–1912), U.S. Senator from Mississippi from 1909 to 1910
 John Brown Gordon (1832–1904), U.S. Senator from Georgia from 1873 to 1880

United States state senate members
 Bernard G. Gordon (1916–1978), New York State Senate
 Edward Francis Gordon (1928-2013), Kansas State Senate
 George Anderson Gordon (1830–1872), Georgia State Senate
 Harry L. Gordon (1860–1921), Kansas State Senate
 Jack Gordon (Mississippi politician) (1944–2011), Mississippi State Senate
 James Wright Gordon (1809–1853), Michigan State Senate
 James Gordon (New York politician) (1739–1810), New York State Senate
 Janet Hill Gordon (1915–1990), New York State Senate
 Powhatan Gordon (1802–1879), Tennessee State Senate
 Randy Gordon (politician) (born 1953), Washington State Senate
 Robert M. Gordon (born 1950), New Jersey State Senate
 William Washington Gordon (1796–1842), Georgia State Senate
 William Gordon (New Hampshire politician) (1763–1802), New Hampshire State Senate